Cuneate means "wedge-shaped", and can apply to:

 Cuneate leaf, a leaf shape
 Cuneate nucleus, a part of the brainstem
 Cuneate fasciculus, a tract from the spinal cord into the brainstem